Maria Margarita Amada Fteha Isidro (born July 20, 1966), known professionally as Agot Isidro, is a Filipino actress and singer. She is the fourth of the six children of Jose Isidro, an architect, and Palestinian mother Edwarta Fteha. She graduated from the University of the Philippines Diliman with a bachelor's degree in interior design. Isidro also pursued Fashion Buying and Merchandising at Fashion Institute of Technology in New York City, where she graduated as magna cum laude. She also has a master's degree in communication from the Ateneo de Manila University.

Isidro started as a back-up singer together with her sisters Olive Cruz and Tina Isorena in The Sharon Cuneta Show. She was urged by Johnny Manahan or Mr. M to fill in for then pregnant Melissa de Leon in the noon time show 'Sang Linggo nAPO Sila. She was like a breath of fresh air and people started noticing her, hence, the moniker "Crush ng Bayan" or "the people's crush" and also as the "Julia Roberts of the Philippines". She is best known for her role as Ingrid Martinez, the main villainess in the 2009 hit television series, Tayong Dalawa. She then played kind-hearted roles.

In 2012, she transferred to GMA Network and signed an exclusive contract in Kapuso Network, her first major project was the television series of GMA Network entitled, One True Love where in she played Leila Samonte, the     bitter and scheming doctor who made Elize and Tisoy lives miserable. She later returned to her original home network, ABS-CBN, as a freelancer in 2013 through a comeback project via Muling Buksan ang Puso, starring Julia Montes, Enrique Gil and Enchong Dee while also being seen in GMA-7's Titser. Isidro played a supporting role as Marian Rivera's mother in Carmela on GMA Network but immediately started doing projects with ABS-CBN after the show ended.

Early life
Isidro grew up in Marikina along with her parents and siblings. She is the youngest among the girls and considered herself as "daddy's girl". Growing up, she never saw herself as beautiful because of her ethnic features as a child. Isidro was skinny, dark-skinned, black hair, and has knobby knees compared to her siblings who were light-skinned and brown-haired. Because of her looks, she was teased a lot by her siblings and relatives, which left her emotionally scarred.

After graduating college in UP Diliman, she left home and pursued a degree in Fashion Buying and Merchandising in the prestigious Fashion Institute of Technology in New York City. New Yorkers were fascinated by her ethnic features, which gave Isidro a boost of confidence and self-esteem. Living alone, she felt homesick and struggled to make ends meet with her allowance given by her parents. However, Isidro was determined to prove that she could live alone in the Big Apple. She focused on school and graduated magna cum laude.

When she entered show business at age 25, she was like a breath of fresh air to the Filipino audience. Her beauty and talent stood out and was given the title as "crush ng bayan" or "people's crush" because of her girl-next-door persona. Isidro continued to rise as a talent and was given numerous projects including recording albums, movies, television, and theater. Up to this date, she is considered to be one of the most beautiful women and best dressed celebrities in the Philippines.

TV commercial
Century Tuna featuring Korina Sanchez and Dina Bonnevie (June 1995)

Filmography

Film

Television/Digital

Music video appearances

Theater
Isidro made her theatrical debut in August 2003 with Honk!, a musical inspired by Hans Christian Andersen's "The Ugly Duckling." Isidro played Ida, the mother of the "ugly duckling" played by Rajo Laurel. The musical was under Trumpets Production and was directed by Chari Arespacochaga. Honk! was held at the Meralco Theater on August 1 till September 7, 2003.

After her Honk! debut, Isidro starred in Atlantis Production's "Baby The Musical" in August 2004. She played Pam Sakarian, a basketball coach in her 30s opposite Jett Pangan, who played her husband Nick Sakarian. The story involves the couple's struggle to conceive after being married for two years. The couple found out that Pam was pregnant but later realized that it was the wrong Mrs. Sakarian, Nick's sister-in-law. The play was directed by Bobby Garcia and was held at the Meralco Theater.

Discography
1993 Sa Isip Ko
1995 Hush
1996 The Best of Agot Isidro
1997 Winds Of Change
1999 Best in Me
2006 The Island
2006 Silver Series
2009 White Lace and Promises
2015 (soon) Ikaw Parin

Singles
"Everyday" (1994)
"Sa Isip Ko"
"Beginning Today"
"Sandali na Lang"
"Loving You"

Awards and nominations

References

External links

1966 births
Living people
20th-century Filipino actresses
20th-century Filipino women singers
21st-century Filipino actresses
Actresses from Metro Manila
Ateneo de Manila University alumni
Filipino film actresses
Filipino musical theatre actresses
Filipino people of Palestinian descent
Filipino television actresses
Filipino women comedians
Filipino television variety show hosts
People from Marikina
PolyEast Records artists
Singers from Metro Manila
University of the Philippines Diliman alumni
ABS-CBN personalities
GMA Network personalities
Viva Artists Agency
Viva Records (Philippines) artists